The Malmö Östra hospital murders were a Swedish case of serial murders committed by the 18-year-old Anders Hansson at a hospital in Malmö between October 1978 and January 1979. Hansson poisoned elderly patients during his working hours as an orderly with the detergents Gevisol and Ivisol.

At the long-term care part of the hospital, a total of 27 patients were poisoned to death, with at least 15 confirmed victims. Another 15 patients were also victims of attempted murder. In August 1979, Hansson was sentenced to closed psychiatric treatment, where he remained until 1994.

References

1978 murders in Sweden
1979 murders in Sweden
1970s in Malmö